Hartmut Schade (born 13 November 1954 in Radeberg, East Germany) is a German former football player and won the gold medal with the East German Olympic team at the 1976 Summer Olympics.

He played for Dynamo Dresden in the East German top flight.

Schade won – without matches within the Olympic Football Tournament – 28 caps for the East Germany national team.

References

External links
 
 
 

1954 births
Living people
People from Radeberg
German footballers
East German footballers
Dynamo Dresden players
Dynamo Dresden managers
Footballers at the 1976 Summer Olympics
Olympic footballers of East Germany
Olympic gold medalists for East Germany
East Germany international footballers
Dynamo Dresden non-playing staff
Olympic medalists in football
DDR-Oberliga players
Medalists at the 1976 Summer Olympics
Association football midfielders
Footballers from Saxony
German football managers